The Alex Salmond scandal refers to the political scandal in Scotland concerning the behaviour of former First Minister of Scotland, Alex Salmond, and his successor, incumbent First Minister Nicola Sturgeon. The scandal created a feud within the Scottish National Party and a ministerial code investigation into Sturgeon conducted by James Hamilton concluded that she did not break the ministerial code over her conduct with Salmond.

The following is a timeline of events that happened in the Alex Salmond political scandal.

2017 

 Late 2017: The Scottish Government receives sexual harassment complaints against Salmond, concerning his behaviour while he was First Minister.

2018 

 29 March: Sturgeon meets with Salmond's former chief of staff, Geoff Aberdein, in her office at Holyrood.
 2 April: Salmond meets with Sturgeon at her private residence in Glasgow.
 6 June: Sturgeon informs the Scottish Government's Permanent Secretary, Leslie Evans, that she knows about the inquiry into harassment complaints and has discussed it with Salmond.
 29 August: Salmond formally begins his judicial review of the government’s handling of harassment complaints against him. He also resigns his membership from the Scottish National Party amid allegations of sexual misconduct.
 30 August: The Scottish Parliament establish the Committee on the Scottish Government Handling of Harassment Complaints to investigate the Scottish Government’s handling of the affair.
 31 August: Then senior counsel for the government, Roddy Dunlop QC, warns the government that the revelation that a senior official had previously met and briefed the two complainers was “extremely concerning”.
 6 December: Leslie Evans is warned by Roddy Dunlop QC that Salmond’s legal challenge will “more likely than not succeed”.
 31 December: Evans concedes the judicial review.

2019 

 8 January: The Court of Session, Scotland's supreme civil court, declares the inquiry unlawful on procedural grounds and Salmond is awarded £512,000 in legal costs.
 13 January: Sturgeon refers herself to the independent ministerial ethics body after opposition parties raise concerns about her meetings with Salmond.
 24 January: Police Scotland arrest Salmond, and he was charged with 14 offences, including two counts of attempted rape, nine of sexual assault, two of indecent assault, and one of breach of the peace.

2020 

 23 March: Salmond is cleared of all charges. A jury finds him not guilty of 12 charges, one charge was dropped by prosecutors earlier in the trial while one charge was found not proven.
 8 December: Sturgeon's husband and Chief Executive of the SNP, Peter Murrell, gives his evidence to the Scottish Parliament's inquiry.

2021 

 26 February: Salmond goes before the Scottish Parliament's Committee on the Scottish Government Handling of Harassment Complaints.
 3 March: Sturgeon gives her evidence before the committee. 
 19 March: A leaked Scottish Parliament committee report on the handling of the government's allegations finds Sturgeon misled parliament. On the same day, Leader Scottish Conservatives, Douglas Ross, calls for her resignation or a motion of no confidence vote will be brought to parliament.
 22 March: Sturgeon is cleared of breaching the ministerial code by a report by James Hamilton QC.
 23 March: The official report of the Scottish Parliament's inquiry into the Scottish Government’s handling of sexual harassment allegations is found by a majority of votes that Sturgeon misled parliament. Opposition leader in Holyrood, Ruth Davidson, motions a vote of no confidence against Sturgeon. She survives the vote by 65 to 31 to reject the motion, with the Scottish Greens supporting the SNP and Scottish Labour and Liberal Democrats abstaining.
 26 March: Salmond is announced as the new leader of the Alba Party and announces his intention to seek election at the May election.
 6 May: The Scottish people vote at the 2021 Scottish Parliament election. Sturgeon secures a third term and Salmond's new party fails to win any seats.

See also 

 Alex Salmond scandal
 HM Advocate v Salmond
 Committee on the Scottish Government Handling of Harassment Complaints

References 

Scottish National Party
First Ministers of Scotland
Nicola Sturgeon
Alex Salmond